Gynecological Endocrinology is a monthly peer-reviewed medical journal covering experimental, clinical, and therapeutic aspects of the discipline. The journal includes papers related to the control and function of the different endocrine glands in women, the effects of reproductive events on the endocrine system, and the consequences of endocrine disorders on reproduction. It is the official journal of the International Society of Gynecological Endocrinology.

Gynecological Endocrinology is published by Informa and is edited by Anrea R. Genazzani (University of Pisa, Italy).

The journal was established in 1987 and has a 2009 impact factor of 1.360, ranking it 44th out of 70 journals in the category "Obstetrics and Gynecology".

References 

Obstetrics and gynaecology journals
Endocrinology journals